Amazing Interiors is an American reality television series on Netflix that focuses on homes with unusual interiors. The show's first season of 12 episodes was released on Netflix on July 20, 2018.

The show's premise revolves around finding and showcasing homes that, despite their ordinary exterior appearance, have unique, custom interiors. The show often features homes that double as part-time museums, rooms where the owners do not actively live, such as basements, garages, a hockey fan cave, a bunker, and a backyard roller coaster.

Format 
Each episode follows a similar format, featuring three different houses. One home is under construction or renovation, and the episode follows the process throughout the remodel. The other two houses are shown as segments during the show.

The show has no host or narrator.

Episodes

See also 
 Talliston House - featured in episode two.
 Angels and Muse - a coworking space in Lagos for art residencies and exhibitions put up by Nigerian artist Victor Ehikhamenor, featured in episode ten.

References

External links 
  on Netflix
 

English-language Netflix original programming
2018 American television series debuts
2010s American reality television series
2018 American television series endings